Conte  Carlo Antonio Manzini (1599–1677/1678) was an Italian astronomer and mathematician. (His last name is sometimes given as Mangini or Mansini).

Biography 
A member of the Bolognese nobility, he was one of the founders of the Accademia dei Vespertini. Manzini published works on various phenomena, including comets, geodesy, and declination of the compass. In 1626 he published Tabulae primi mobilis: quibus nova dirigendi ars et praecipue circuli positionis inventio, non minus facilis quam exacta ostenditur. This volume presented tables for the construction of astrological charts.

His 1660 work, L'occhiale all'occhio, dioptrica practica, is one of the oldest accounts of the techniques for manufacturing lenses through grinding and polishing. Manzini was in close personal contact with the two principal makers of telescopes in Italy, Francesco Fontana and Eustachio Divini. A portrait of Divini is included in his book which forms a complete practical manual for the artisan in the construction of both microscopes and telescopes.

A skilled astronomer, Manzini made astronomical observations from his private observatory, which he maintained at his villa at Battedizzo near Bologna.

Sources list his year of death as 1677 or 1678. The crater Manzinus on the Moon is named after him.

Works

Bibliography

External links 
 
 
 Libra antichi - Biblioteca "Guido Horn d'Arturo"
 Smithsonian Institution Libraries

1599 births
1678 deaths